Letlhakeng or Lethakeng is an urban village in Kweneng District of Botswana. The village is located 75 km north-west of Molepolole. The population of Letlhakeng was 7,229 in the 2011 census.

The majority of the people of Letlhakeng are considered part of the Bakwena tribe, which is administered from the kgotla in Molepolole. However, aside from the Bakwena version of standard Setswana (known as Se-kwena), many people speak a version of Se-Kgalagadi - a language distinct from but related to Setswana.

Letlhakeng houses a secondary school (Mphuthe Community Secondary) which moved into new buildings in 2008 following relocation from a previous site prone to subsidence. A clinic serves the community as well as three primary schools and a number of local government offices. Until 2005, the tarred roads ended at the village centre and onward journeys were seasonally interrupted due to the gravel or sand roads. However, it is now possible to travel to most neighbouring villages without difficulty following a major road building programme.

There are three schools in Letlhakeng being;
Letlhakeng Primary School
Gothibamang Primary School
Mphuthe Junior Secondary School

Notable people
 

Eric Molebatsi, Botswanan former footballer

See also

List of cities in Botswana

References

There are 8 wards in the village. Namely Legononong,Shageng,Molehele,Goo Modimo,Goo Moiphisi,Goo Ratshosa,Mokwele and Ralebakeng.Historically the village was named after long reeds that were found along the long stream that traverses the village.

Kweneng District
Villages in Botswana